St. Stephen's Hospital (永清圣司提反医院) in Beijing, China.  It was founded by the Anglican Church of China.  There was a masascare at the hospital during World War II.

References

Hospital buildings completed in 1958
Hospitals in Beijing
Hospitals established in the 1930s